Bertrand du Pouget (Italian Bertrando del Poggetto) (1280 – 3 February 1352) was a French papal diplomat and Cardinal.

Bertrand was born in Castelnau-Montratier.  He may have been a nephew of Pope John XXII. As cardinal he was closely involved in dealing with the practical consequences of the migration of the papacy to Avignon, and also in striving to uphold papal prestige in Italy, for example by artistic commissions in Bologna. He expelled Galeazzo I Visconti, imperial vicar for Emperor Henry VII, from Piacenza  and in 1329 arranged for a public burning of Dante's De monarchia.

He was created cardinal priest of S. Marcello in 1316, and became bishop of Ostia in 1327. He participated in the conclave of 1334 that elected Pope Benedict XII and the conclave of 1342 that elected Pope Clement VI. He died at Villeneuve-lès-Avignon.

Notes

See also
The Name of the Rose - a historical novel by Umberto Eco in which Bertrand du Pouget is one of the characters.

1280 births
1352 deaths
14th-century French cardinals
Cardinal-bishops of Ostia
Cardinal-nephews